Bhutua
Comilla Adarsha Sadar Upazila of Comilla District, Bangladesh.

Demographics
According to the 2011 Bangladesh census, Bhutua had 125 households and a population of 674.

Economy
About 65% of those employed are engaged in agriculture, with the remainder being in the service sector. The nearest market is in Chowara.

Education
The village includes one of girls' High school,

See also
 List of villages in Bangladesh

References

Villages in Comilla District
Villages in Chittagong Division